Jieshou is a town in Gaoyou, Yangzhou, Jiangsu.  , it has one residential community and eight villages under its administration.

Transport
Gaoyou North railway station

References

Gaoyou
Township-level divisions of Jiangsu